Jimmy Andrés Cisterna Moya (born 5 April 1993) is a Chilean footballer that currently plays for Deportes Temuco of the Chilean First Division B.

Club career
He began his career at Santiago Wanderers youth set-up aged 14, joining Valparaíso-based after playing for several neighborhood clubs. In mid-2012 he was promoted to the first adult team and made his professional debut in a 1–1 away draw with O'Higgins on 21 October.

References

External links
 

1993 births
Living people
Chilean footballers
Chilean Primera División players
Santiago Wanderers footballers
Association football midfielders